Kushk Rural District is in the Central District of Bafq County, Yazd province, Iran. At the National Census of 2006, its population was 553 in 184 households. There were 1,119 inhabitants in 366 households at the following census of 2011. At the most recent census of 2016, the population of the rural district was 408 in 127 households. The largest of its 68 villages was Kushk, with 139 people.

References 

Bafq County

Rural Districts of Yazd Province

Populated places in Yazd Province

Populated places in Bafq County